Sebiș is a town in Arad County, western Transylvania, Romania. Situated 82 km from the county capital, Sebiș is one of the most important urban centres in the Crișul Alb valley. It administers three villages: Donceni (Dancsfalva), Prunișor (Kertes) and Sălăjeni (Szelezsény). Its territory occupies 61.81 square km in the greater Sebiș Basin, which is a sub-unit of the Crișul Alb Basin.

Demographics

According to the 2011 census, the town has 5,831 inhabitants, of which 90.53% are Romanians, 6.68% Roma, 2.31% Hungarians, and 0,1% are of other or undeclared ethnicities.

History
The first documentary mention of the locality dates back to the year 1552, while later, in 1746 Sebiș had a market status. Donceni was registered in 1439, Prunișor in 1406 and Sălăjeni in 1574.

Until the end of the 18th century Sebiș had been under Ottoman occupation and later under Habsburg administration. During the latter period the settlement had undergone an accentuated development.

Economy
The Sebiș Solar Park, completed in December 2013, has about 317,000 state-of-the-art thin film photovoltaic panels, for a total nameplate capacity of 65 megawatts.  This is the largest photovoltaic power station in Romania, built at a cost of €100 million.

Tourism
For the tourists Sebiș is the point of departure towards the superior course of the Crișului Alb River, towards the thermal bath in Moneasa and towards the peaks of the Codru-Moma Mountains.

Natives
Mihai Beniuc

References

External links

 Site dedicated to the city

Populated places in Arad County
Towns in Romania
Localities in Crișana